The 1990 African Cup of Champions Clubs was the 26th edition of the annual international club football competition held in the CAF region (Africa), the African Cup of Champions Clubs. It determined that year's club champion of association football in Africa.

JS Kabylie from Algeria won that final, and became for the second time CAF club champion - having won in 1981 as JE Tizi-Ouzou.

Preliminary round

|}

First round

|}

Second round

|}

1 Raja Casablanca were forced to withdraw due to their key players being called up to play for the national squad.

Quarter-finals

|}

Semi-finals

|}

Final

Champion

Top scorers

The top scorers from the 1990 African Cup of Champions Clubs are as follows:

References
RSSSF.com

1
African Cup of Champions Clubs